Max Adalbert (born Johannes Adolph Krampf; 19 February 1874 – 7 September 1933) was a German stage and film actor.

Biography 
Adalbert was born in Danzig (Gdansk), Imperial Germany as Maximilian Adalbert Krampf to a Prussian Officer. He used his first names as his stage name from the start of his career and debuted at the age of 19 at the theater of Lübeck and in 1894 at the municipal theater of Barmen. Adalbert also appeared in St.Gallen, Nuremberg and Vienna. He moved to Berlin in 1899 to work at the Residenztheater. Coming in contact with Curt Bois, Adalbert turned into a comedian and co-founded the popular Kabarett der Komiker in December 1924. On 30 May 1931 he made his debut as the central character of Carl Zuckmayer's Der Hauptmann von Köpenick at the Deutsches Theater in Berlin, which was filmed in the same year.

Max Adalbert died of pneumonia while in Munich for a guest performance, and was buried at the celebrities cemetery Südwestkirchhof at Berlin Stahnsdorf.

Selected filmography

References

External links
 
Photos of Max Adalbert
suedwestkirchhof Stahnsdorf

1874 births
1933 deaths
German male film actors
German male silent film actors
German male stage actors
Male actors from Gdańsk
19th-century German male actors
20th-century German male actors
People from the Province of Prussia
Deaths from pneumonia in Germany